Belisle or Bélisle is a surname, derived from an island off the coast of France called “Belle Ile” (Beautiful Isle). Notable people with the name include:

 Danny Belisle (born 1937), Canadian ice hockey player and coach
 Eugene Belisle (1910–1983), American Olympic rower
 Ève Bélisle (born 1979), Canadian curler and amateur ornithologist
 Jerome J. Belisle (1932-2022), American businessman and politician
 J. Denis Bélisle, Canadian diplomat
 Khalid Belisle (born 1981), Belizean politician; mayor of Belmopan
 Lyndsay Belisle (born 1977), Canadian freestyle wrestler
 Matt Belisle (born 1980), American baseball pitcher
 Mitch Belisle (born 1985), American lacrosse player
 Polin Belisle (born 1966), Olympic marathon runner for Belize and Honduras
 Rhéal Bélisle (1919–1992), Canadian politician from Ontario
 Richard Bélisle (born 1946), Canadian politician from Quebec
 Roger Belisle (born 1947), Canadian ice hockey player